Derries is a townland in Athlone, County Westmeath, Ireland. The townland is in the civil parish of St. Mary's.

The townland stands to the south of the town, to the east of the River Shannon.

References 

Townlands of County Westmeath